Gediminas Paulauskas (born 27 October 1982) is a former Lithuanian footballer.

Formerly from February to June 2008 played for AC Bellinzona after release by MKE Ankaragücü in February. MKE Ankaragücü signed him from FK Ekranas in December 2007. In July 2008 he turned back to his homeland and move to Vetra Vilnius. He signed a deal until 31 December 2009.

Paulauskas has made 22 appearances for the Lithuania national football team.

Honours
National Team
 Baltic Cup
 2005

References

External links

1982 births
Living people
People from Panevėžys
Lithuanian footballers
Association football defenders
Lithuania international footballers
Lithuanian expatriate footballers
Expatriate footballers in Turkey
Expatriate footballers in Switzerland
Expatriate footballers in Ukraine
Lithuanian expatriate sportspeople in Ukraine
Expatriate footballers in Poland
Expatriate footballers in Belarus
Expatriate footballers in Uzbekistan
Süper Lig players
Ukrainian Premier League players
FK Ekranas players
MKE Ankaragücü footballers
AC Bellinzona players
FK Vėtra players
FC Mariupol players
Piast Gliwice players
FC Dynamo Brest players
FK Andijon players